Leptolepis (from  , 'slight' and   'scale') is an extinct genus of stem-teleost fish that lived in what is now Europe during the Jurassic period (Toarcian–Callovian ages).

Species 
The genus Leptolepis was for a long time used as a wastebasket taxon for various small, unspecialised teleosts that did not form a natural clade. In 1974 the Swedish ichthyologist Orvar Nybelin revised the genus, restricting it to seven species from the Early to Middle Jurassic of Europe. Other species were reassigned to different genera.

 Leptolepis autissiodorensis 
 Leptolepis coryphaenoides 
 Leptolepis jaegeri 
 Leptolepis nathorsti 
 Leptolepis normandica 
 Leptolepis saltviciensis 
 Leptolepis woodwardi

Species formerly placed in Leptolepis 
 Leptolepis talbragarensis  (Now referred to Cavenderichthys)
 Leptolepis koonwarri  (Now referred to Waldmanichthys)

Appearance 

While more basal teleosts such as Pholidophorus had skeletons composed of a mixture of bone and cartilage, Leptolepis resembled modern teleosts in possessing a skeleton completely made of bone. Another modern development in Leptolepis were its cycloid scales, which lacked the covering of ganoine present in more basal teleosts. These two developments made swimming easier, as the bony spine was now more resistant to the pressure caused by the S movements made while swimming.

Mass graves of Leptolepis have indicated that species probably lived in schools which would provide some protection from predators while the creatures fed on surface plankton. Pelagosaurus was a known predator of Leptolepis, as a Pelagosaurus fossil was found with Leptolepis remains in its stomach. Clarkeiteuthis is known from three specimens with Leptolepis in its arms, which estimate that Leptolepis is probably most common prey of Clarkeiteuthis.

The Morrison cf. Leptolepis
Known only from a single nearly complete skeleton found at Rabbit Valley, Colorado. A  fish that was deeper bodied than its co-occurring contemporaries Morrolepis and Hulettia. The Morrison cf. It is the only teleost fish known from the formation and was morphologically more highly derived than other Morrison fish. A specific example of apomorphy in cf. Leptolepis is its "more modern tail structure" compared to Morrolepis. It is believed to have fed on fish and small invertebrates.

References

Bibliography
 Silva Santos, R. (1958) - Leptolepis diasii, novo peixe fossil da Serra do Araripe, Brasil”. Boletim da Divisa˜o de Geologia e Mineralogia do Departamento Nacional de Produc¸a˜o Mineral, Notas Preliminares, Brazil 108, 1–15. o, Kiadó: Departamento Nacional de Produc¸a˜o Mineral. 
 Maisey, J.. Santana fossils, an illustrated atlas. Neptune City, New Jersey, USA: T.F.H. Publications (1991)
 Silva Santos, R. (1995) - Santanichthys, novo epı´teto gene´rico para Leptolepis diasii Silva Santos, 1958 (Pisces, Teleostei) da Formac¸a˜o Santana (Aptiano), Bacia do Araripe, NE do Brasil”. Anais da Academia Brasileira de Cieˆncias, Brazil 67, 249–258. o, Kiadó: Academia Brasileira de Cieˆncias. 
 Filleul, Arnaud, John G. Maisey (2004) - Redescription of Santanichthys diasii (Otophysi, Characiformes) from the Albian of the Santana Formation and Comments on Its Implications for Otophysan Relationships”. American Museum Novitates, New York, NY, USA 3455, American Museum of Natural History

Prehistoric teleostei
Prehistoric ray-finned fish genera
Toarcian genus first appearances
Bathonian genera
Callovian genus extinctions
Jurassic bony fish
Jurassic fish of Europe
Jurassic England
Jurassic France
Jurassic Germany
Jurassic Italy
Jurassic Norway
Fossils of England
Fossils of France
Fossils of Germany
Fossils of Italy
Fossils of Norway
Fossil taxa described in 1843
Taxa named by Louis Agassiz